Elsholtzia is a plant genus in the Lamiaceae (mint family). It is widespread across much of temperate and tropical Asia from Siberia south to China, Northeastern India, Indonesia, etc.
The genus was named in honour of the Prussian naturalist Johann Sigismund Elsholtz.

Species
Elsholtzia amurensis Prob. - Amur region of Russia
Elsholtzia angustifolia (Loes.) Kitag. - Korea, Manchuria
Elsholtzia argyi H.Lév. - southern China, Vietnam
Elsholtzia beddomei C.B.Clarke ex Hook.f. - Myanmar, Thailand
Elsholtzia blanda (Benth.) Benth. - southern China, Himalayas, Indochina, Sumatra, Viet Nam
Elsholtzia bodinieri Vaniot - Guizhou, Yunnan
Elsholtzia byeonsanensis M.Kim - South Korea
Elsholtzia capituligera C.Y.Wu - Tibet, Sichuan, Yunnan
Elsholtzia cephalantha Hand.-Mazz. - Sichuan
Elsholtzia ciliata (Thunb.) Hyl. - widespread across Siberia, Russian Far East, China, India, Himalayas, Japan, Korea, Indochina
Elsholtzia communis (Collett & Hemsl.) Diels - Myanmar, Thailand, Vietnam
Elsholtzia concinna Vautier - Nepal, Sikkim, Bhutan
Elsholtzia cyprianii (Pavol.) C.Y.Wu & S.Chow - central  + southern China
Elsholtzia densa Benth. -  India, Pakistan, Nepal, Bhutan, Afghanistan, Kyrgyzstan, Tajikistan, Tibet, Xingjiang, China, Mongolia 
Elsholtzia eriocalyx C.Y.Wu & S.C.Huang - southern China
Elsholtzia eriostachya (Benth.) Benth. - China, Tibet, Himalayas
Elsholtzia feddei H.Lév - China, Tibet
Elsholtzia flava Benth. - China, Himalayas
Elsholtzia fruticosa (D.Don) Rehder - China, Himalayas, Tibet, Myanmar
Elsholtzia glabra C.Y.Wu & S.C.Huang - China
Elsholtzia griffithii Hook.f - Myanmar, Assam
Elsholtzia hallasanensis Y.N.Lee - Jeju-do Island in Korea
Elsholtzia heterophylla Diels - Yunnan, Myanmar
Elsholtzia hunanensis Hand.-Mazz. - southern China
Elsholtzia kachinensis Prain - southern China, Myanmar, Thailand
Elsholtzia litangensis C.X.Pu & W.Y.Chen - Sichuan
Elsholtzia luteola Diels - Sichuan, Yunnan
Elsholtzia minima Nakai - Jeju-do Island in Korea
Elsholtzia myosurus Dunn - Sichuan, Yunnan
Elsholtzia nipponica Ohwi - Japan
Elsholtzia ochroleuca Dunn - Sichuan, Yunnan
Elsholtzia oldhamii Hemsl. - Taiwan
Elsholtzia penduliflora W.W.Sm - Yunnan, Thailand, Vietnam
Elsholtzia pilosa (Benth.) Benth. - China, Himalayas, Myanmar, Vietnam
Elsholtzia pubescens Benth. - Java, Bali, Lombok, Timor, Sulawesi
Elsholtzia pygmaea W.W.Sm. - Yunnan
Elsholtzia rugulosa Hemsl - southern China, Myanmar, Thailand
Elsholtzia serotina Kom - northern China, Japan, Korea, Primorye
Elsholtzia souliei H.Lév. - Sichuan, Yunnan
Elsholtzia splendens Nakai ex F.Maek. - China, Korea
Elsholtzia stachyodes (Link) Raizada & H.O.Saxena - Indian Subcontinent, China, Myanmar
Elsholtzia stauntonii Benth. - northern China
Elsholtzia strobilifera (Benth.) Benth. - China, Himalayas, Myanmar
Elsholtzia winitiana Craib - Yunnan, Guangxi, Laos, Thailand, Vietnam

References

Lamiaceae
Lamiaceae genera